The transfer-matrix method is a method used in optics and acoustics to analyze the propagation of electromagnetic or acoustic waves through a stratified medium. This is, for example, relevant for the design of anti-reflective coatings and dielectric mirrors.

The reflection of light from a single interface between two media is described by the Fresnel equations. However, when there are multiple interfaces, such as in the figure, the reflections themselves are also partially transmitted and then partially reflected. Depending on the exact path length, these reflections can interfere destructively or constructively. The overall reflection of a layer structure is the sum of an infinite number of reflections.

The transfer-matrix method is based on the fact that, according to Maxwell's equations, there are simple continuity conditions for the electric field across boundaries from one medium to the next. If the field is known at the beginning of a layer, the field at the end of the layer can be derived from a simple matrix operation. A stack of layers can then be represented as a system matrix, which is the product of the individual layer matrices. The final step of the method involves converting the system matrix back into reflection and transmission coefficients.

Formalism for electromagnetic waves

Below is described how the transfer matrix is applied to electromagnetic waves (for example light) of a given frequency propagating through a stack of layers at normal incidence. It can be generalized to deal with incidence at an angle, absorbing media, and media with magnetic properties. We assume that the stack layers are normal to the  axis and that the field within one layer can be represented as the superposition of a left- and right-traveling wave with wave number ,
.
Because it follows from Maxwell's equation that electric field  and magnetic field (its normalized derivative)  must be continuous across a boundary, it is convenient to represent the field as the vector , where
.

and

Such a matrix can represent propagation through a layer if  is the wave number in the medium and  the thickness of the layer:
For a system with  layers, each layer  has a transfer matrix , where  increases towards higher  values. The system transfer matrix is then

Typically, one would like to know the reflectance and transmittance of the layer structure.

On the other side of the layer structure, the field consists of a right-propagating transmitted field

in terms of the matrix elements  of the system matrix  and obtain

and

.

Example
As an illustration, consider a single layer of glass with a refractive index n and thickness d suspended in air at a wave number k (in air). The transfer matrix is
.
The amplitude reflection coefficient can be simplified to 
.

Acoustic waves

It is possible to apply the transfer-matrix method to sound waves. Instead of the electric field E and its derivative F, the displacement u and the stress , where  is the p-wave modulus, should be used.

Abeles matrix formalism

The Abeles matrix method is a computationally fast and easy way to calculate the specular reflectivity from a stratified interface, as a function of the perpendicular momentum transfer, Qz:

where θ is the angle of incidence/reflection of the incident radiation and λ is the wavelength of the radiation.
The measured reflectivity depends on the variation in the scattering length density (SLD)
profile, ρ(z), perpendicular to the interface. Although the scattering length density profile
is normally a continuously varying function, the interfacial structure can often be well approximated 
by a slab model in which layers of thickness (dn), scattering length density (ρn) and roughness (σn,n+1) are sandwiched between the super- and sub-phases. One then uses a refinement procedure to minimise the differences between the theoretical and measured reflectivity curves, by changing the parameters that describe each layer.

In this description the interface is split into n layers. Since the incident neutron beam
is refracted by each of the layers the wavevector, k, in layer n, is given by:

The Fresnel reflection coefficient between layer n and n+1 is then given by:

Since the interface between each layer is unlikely to be perfectly smooth the roughness/diffuseness of each interface modifies the Fresnel coefficient and is accounted for by an error function, as described by Nevot and Croce (1980).

A phase factor, β, is introduced, which accounts for the thickness of each layer.

where .
A characteristic matrix, cn is then calculated for each layer.

The resultant matrix is defined as the ordered product of these characteristic matrices

from which the reflectivity is calculated as:

See also 
Neutron reflectometry
Ellipsometry
Jones calculus
X-ray reflectivity

References

Further reading

Multilayer Reflectivity: first-principles derivation of the transmission and reflection probabilities from a multilayer with complex indices of refraction.
Layered Materials and Photonic Band Diagrams (Lecture 23) in MIT Open Course Electronic, Optical and Magnetic Properties of Materials.
EM Wave Propagation Through Thin Films & Multilayers (Lecture 13) in MIT Open Course Nano-to-Macro Transport Processes. Includes short discussion acoustic waves.

External links
There are a number of computer programs that implement this calculation:
FreeSnell is a stand-alone computer program that implements the transfer-matrix method, including more advanced aspects such as granular films.
Thinfilm is a web interface that implements the transfer-matrix method, outputting reflection and transmission coefficients, and also ellipsometric parameters Psi and Delta.
Luxpop.com is another web interface that implements the transfer-matrix method.
Transfer-matrix calculating programs in Python and in Mathematica.
EMPy ("Electromagnetic Python") software.
motofit is a program for analysing neutron and X-ray reflectometry data.
OpenFilters is a program for designing optical filters.
Py_matrix is an open source Python code that implements the transfer-matrix method for multilayers with arbitrary dielectric tensors. It was especially created for plasmonic and magnetoplasmonic calculations.
In-browser calculator and fitter Javascript interactive reflectivity calculator using matrix method and Nevot-Croce roughness approximation (calculation kernel converted from C via Emscripten)

Physical optics
Neutron-related techniques
Scattering theory
Electromagnetism